PPUR may refer to:
 Presses polytechniques et universitaires romandes, university press of French-speaking Switzerland
 Puerto Princesa Underground River, see Puerto Princesa Subterranean River National Park
 People's Patriotic Union of Russia (NPSR)